Cherry Adair (born 2 April 1951) is a South African–American romantic fiction writer. She lives near Seattle, Washington with her husband.

Biography
Born in Cape Town, South Africa, Adair moved to the United States in her early 20s and settled in San Francisco, where she opened a business as an interior designer. Adair and her husband, David, have two daughters; they keep two standard schnauzers, Max and Chase, who compete nationally in agility trials.  A voracious reader, she began to have story ideas of her own and transferred her creative process from interior design to writing novels, writing seventeen full books before her first novel, The Mercenary, sold to Harlequin for their Temptation line in 1994.

In 2000, Adair published Kiss and Tell, the second of what was to become her popular T-FLAC series with Ballantine.  The series involves operatives in Terrorist Force Logistical Assault Command (T-FLAC), a fictional secret counter-terrorist force. In 2007, she added a new "psi unit" to the T-FLAC series, where the T-FLAC operatives have wizard powers, taking them into the subgenre of "paranormal romance" with her award-winning Edge trilogy. The books in the continuing series are all classified in a subgenre known as "romantic suspense" and Adair has been touted as 'one of the reigning queens of romantic adventure' by Romantic Times, and is considered 'adept at orchestrating both the thriller action and the tango of desire' in her writing.

Awards

Adair has received a number of awards during her career.  She is a six-time finalist for the RITA Award given by Romance Writers of America, and she has been nominated for the Career Achievement Award for Romantic Suspense from Romantic Times two times.  Her book Hide and Seek tied at number eight with author Nora Roberts for Romance Writers of America Top Ten Books of the Year in 2001. Her awards include the Reviewers' Choice Award for Best Romantic Suspense from Romantic Times for her novel Hot Ice in 2005 and for Best Contemporary Romance for her book Kiss and Tell in 2000.  She's also won the Golden Quill for Best Mainstream Single Title for Kiss and Tell in 2000, three awards from Romance Books and Readers for Best Book, Best Surprise and Best Romantic Suspense in 2000 for Kiss and Tell, the Romance Journal Frances Award for Best Romantic Suspense for Kiss and Tell and three Venus Awards from Heart Rate Reviews for Best Romantic Suspense, Sexiest Romance and Best Newly Discovered Author for her novel Kiss and Tell. She has also won a  Romance Journal Frances Award for Best Category Romance with Seducing Mr. Right 2001.  Recently she took first place in Barclay Gold Contemporary category for Hot Ice in 2006 and first and second in the Barclay Gold Fantasy, Future and Paranormal category with her books Edge of Danger and Edge of Fear in 2007.

Adair's books have appeared on the bestseller lists of Publishers Weekly, USA Today and the New York Times.

Bibliography

Stark Brothers/Lodestone/StoneFish

Ricochet, November 2013
Gideon
Hush
Relentless
After Glow

T-FLAC

The Mercenary, HQN, June 2008 (reprinted with 100 pages added) Harlequin Temptation # 492, May 1994

T-FLAC Black Rose Trilogy
Hot Ice, June 2005
White Heat, June 2007
Ice Cold, October 2012

T-FLAC Edge Trilogy
Edge of Danger, June 2006
Edge of Fear, July 2006
Edge of Darkness, August 2006

T-FLAC Wright Family
Kiss and Tell, November 2000
Hide and Seek, October 2001
In Too Deep, August 2002
Out of Sight, August 2003
On Thin Ice, August 2004

T-FLAC Night Trilogy
Night Fall, August 2008
Night Secrets, September 2008
Night Shadow, October 2008

T-FLAC Fallen Angels
Absolute Doubt 2016

Cutter Cay
Undertow
Riptide
Vortex
Stormchaser
Hurricane
Whirlpool

Short Stories

Playing for Keeps
Ricochet
Tropical Heat
Chameleon
Snowball`s Chance

Novels
Take Me also in Slow Burn
Seducing Mr. Right also in Slow Burn
Blush
Black Magic

Book list by publisher

Pocket

2010 Black Magic (stand alone single title)
2011 Hush (1st of the Lodestone series)
 2012 Afterglow (2nd of the Lodestone series)

St. Martin's Press

 2008 Rescue Me (anthology with Cindy Gerard and Lora Leigh)
 2010 The Bodyguard (anthology with Gena Showalter and Lorie O'Clare
 2011 Undertow (1st of the Cutter Cay series)
 2011 Riptide (2nd of the Cutter Cay series)
 2012 Vortex (3rd of the Cutter Cay series)

Harlequin

The Mercenary, Harlequin Temptation # 492, May 1994
Seducing Mr. Right, Harlequin Temptation #833, June 2001
Take Me, Blaze # 51, August 2002
Date with a Devil (anthology with Anne Stuart and Muriel Jensen) January 2004
The Mercenary, HQN, June 2008 (reprinted with 100 pages added)

Ballantine

Kiss and Tell, November 2000
Hide and Seek, October 2001
In Too Deep, August 2002
Out of Sight, August 2003
On Thin Ice, August 2004
Hot Ice, June 2005
Edge of Danger, T-FLAC psi unit, June 2006
Edge of Fear, T-FLAC psi unit, July 2006
Edge of Darkness, T-FLAC psi unit, August 2006
White Heat, June 2007
Night Fall, T-FLAC psi unit, August 2008
Night Secrets, T-FLAC psi unit, September 2008
Night Shadows, T-FLAC psi unit, October 2008

Signet/NAL

Dare Me, Signet Eclipse, (anthology with Jill Shalvis and Julie Leto) March 2005

Gallery Books

Blush, April 2015

Adair Digital

Ice Cold, (ebook) T-FLAC, October 2012
Chameleon, (ebook), T-FLAC psi novella, September 2013 (originally published as Temptation on Ice in an anthology in 2010)
Ricochet, (ebook), T-FLAC novella, November 2013
Gideon, March 2015

References

External links

American romantic fiction writers
South African emigrants to the United States
Living people
1951 births
American women novelists
20th-century American novelists
21st-century American novelists
Women romantic fiction writers
20th-century American women writers
21st-century American women writers